Bernardo Oliveira Dias (born 4 January 1997), also known as Benny, is a Portuguese professional footballer who plays for Cypriot club Doxa Katokopias FC as a midfielder.

Club career
Born in Lisbon, Dias joined C.F. Os Belenenses' youth system in 2014, aged 17. On 14 August 2016 he made his Primeira Liga debut, starting and playing 56 minutes in a 2–0 away loss against Vitória de Setúbal.

Dias scored his first league goal on 24 September 2017, coming on as a second-half substitute and closing the 4–1 away win over C.D. Feirense. His second arrived the following 9 January, in a 1–1 home draw with Boavista FC. The previous November, he had renewed his contract until 2022 with a €15 million buyout clause. 

On 6 July 2018, Dias was loaned from Belenenses SAD to S.L. Benfica B for one season. His maiden appearance in the LigaPro took place on 11 August, when he started in the 2–1 home defeat of Leixões SC. His first goal arrived on 27 October, helping the hosts beat S.C. Covilhã 3–2.

Dias signed with G.D. Chaves still in the second tier in January 2020. He scored his only goal for the club on 23 September of that year, in a 4–3 victory at Benfica B.

On 14 July 2021, Dias agreed to a deal at Doxa Katokopias FC in the Cypriot First Division.

References

External links

1997 births
Living people
Portuguese footballers
Footballers from Lisbon
Association football midfielders
Primeira Liga players
Liga Portugal 2 players
C.F. Os Belenenses players
Belenenses SAD players
S.L. Benfica B players
G.D. Chaves players
Cypriot First Division players
Doxa Katokopias FC players
Portuguese expatriate footballers
Expatriate footballers in Cyprus
Portuguese expatriate sportspeople in Cyprus